was a lobby-group representing Irish-speaking inhabitants of the Gaeltacht. It was founded in the winter of 1933–34, with Seán Ó Coisdeala, a national school teacher from Tully in Connemara, as President and Pádraig Seoige as secretary. Other founders included Peadar Duignan, Seán Tubridy, and Máirtín Ó Cadhain. In 1935, in conjunction with the Land Commission, it helped to establish the Meath Gaeltacht by transplanting Irish-speaking families from Connacht. Its office was in Kells, County Meath. It was a registered nominating body for the Cultural and Educational Panel of Seanad Éireann through the 1997 election.

References

Irish language organisations
Political advocacy groups in the Republic of Ireland
1934 establishments in Ireland
Organizations established in 1934
Seanad nominating bodies